Golden Rooster for Best Supporting Actress is the main competition category of the Golden Rooster Awards. It is awarded to supporting actresses who have outstanding performance in motion pictures.

Winners & nominees

References

Golden Rooster, Best Supporting Actress
Supporting Actress, Best
Film awards for supporting actress